The Atlantic County Institute of Technology (ACIT) is a four-year countywide vocational public high school serving students in ninth through twelfth grades from Atlantic County, New Jersey, United States, as part of the Atlantic County Vocational School District. ACIT is located on a  campus in the Mays Landing area of Hamilton Township. The school was constructed in 1974 and underwent a major renovation in 1994 and 2009-2011.

As of the 2021–22 school year, the school had an enrollment of 1,751 students and 142.0 classroom teachers (on an FTE basis), for a student–teacher ratio of 12.3:1. There were 755 students (43.1% of enrollment) eligible for free lunch and 169 (9.7% of students) eligible for reduced-cost lunch.

Due to a recent influx of students attending the school, the freshmen are now located in the South Wing, a separate building located behind the main campus that runs parallel to the New Jersey Motor Vehicle Commission.

The school offers eight Academy programs, six Career Technical programs, and the recently added Academy of Aviation Studies. Shared-time students attend vocational programs at ACIT for part of the day, while receiving their academic instruction at one of the public high schools in the county. As of the 2016-2017 school year, the Academy of Aviation Studies was introduced and students in the program are bused to Atlantic Cape Community College daily. The students in the Aviation program are taught regular high school courses, along with the Academy. ACIT has articulation agreements with Atlantic Cape Community College, allowing students in certain programs to earn as many as 15 college credits for courses taken at ACIT. The school has a similar partnership with Camden County College for students in the dental assistant program.

Awards, recognition and rankings
During the 2008-09 school year, Atlantic County Institute of Technology was recognized with the Blue Ribbon School Award of Excellence by the United States Department of Education, the highest award an American school can receive.

Schooldigger.com ranked the school 29th out of 396 public high schools statewide in its 2013 rankings (an increase of 9 positions from the 2012 ranking), which were based on the combined percentage of students classified as proficient or above on the mathematics (95.0%) and language arts literacy (100.0%) components of the High School Proficiency Assessment (HSPA).

The Atlantic County Institute of Technology was recognized in the National Rankings of Best High Schools by U.S. News & World Report and was awarded a bronze medal "based on their performance on state assessments and how well they prepare students for college."

Athletics
The Atlantic County Institute of Technology Red Hawks compete in the Cape-Atlantic League, an athletic conference comprised of public and private high school in Atlantic, Cape May, Cumberland and Gloucester counties, which operates under the aegis of the New Jersey State Interscholastic Athletic Association (NJSIAA). With 1,222 students in grades 10-12, the school was classified by the NJSIAA for the 2019–20 school year as Group IV for most athletic competition purposes, which included schools with an enrollment of 1,060 to 5,049 students in that grade range.

Administration
The school's principal is Joseph Potkay. His administration team includes three assistant principals and the athletic director.

References

External links

Atlantic County Institute of Technology

Data for Atlantic County Institute of Technology, National Center for Education Statistics

1974 establishments in New Jersey
Educational institutions established in 1974
Hamilton Township, Atlantic County, New Jersey
Public high schools in Atlantic County, New Jersey
Vocational schools in New Jersey